Alexander Dalrymple FRS (24 July 1737 – 19 June 1808) was a Scottish geographer and the first Hydrographer of the British Admiralty. He was the main proponent of the theory that there existed a vast undiscovered continent in the South Pacific, Terra Australis Incognita. He produced thousands of nautical charts, mapping a remarkable number of seas and oceans for the first time, and contributing significantly to the safety of shipping. His theories prompted a number of expeditions in search of this mythical land, until James Cook's second journey (1772–1775) led to the conclusion that, if it did exist, it was further south than the 65° line of latitude South.

Life
Dalrymple was born at Newhailes, near Edinburgh, the eleventh of fifteen children of Sir James Dalrymple and his wife, Lady Christian Hamilton, the daughter of the Earl of Haddington.

He went to London in 1752 and was appointed a writer in the British East India Company, being first posted to Madras. He arrived in Madras in 1753. While with the East India Company he became interested in the possibilities of trade with the East Indies and China, and subsequently negotiated a treaty with the sultan of Sulu and visited Canton (Guangzhou) at age 22. He was elected Provisional Deputy Governor by the Manila Council with the departure of Dawsonne Drake on 29 March 1764. He then departed Manila 10 April for Sulu with Sultan Alimuddin I.

In 1765 he returned to London where was elected a fellow of the Royal Society. There he became acquainted with the civil engineer John Smeaton, who during the course of his studies on windmills had devised a descriptive scale for grading wind speed. This scale was included in the paper for which he was awarded the Copley Medal. In Defining the Wind: The Beaufort Scale and How a 19th-Century Admiral Turned Science into Poetry, author Scott Huler relates that Dalrymple's voyages had convinced him that a standard scale for measuring the speed of wind at sea would be of great value to sailors, and that he had included Smeaton's scale in his work Practical Navigation, which was written around 1790 but never published. It is believed that Dalrymple conveyed this information to Francis Beaufort, who later refined the wind scale that bears his name and that is still in use today.

Whilst translating some Spanish documents captured in the British occupation of Manila in 1762, Dalrymple had found Luis Váez de Torres' testimony proving a passage south of New Guinea now known as Torres Strait. This discovery led Dalrymple to publish the Historical Collection of the Several Voyages and Discoveries in the South Pacific Ocean in 1770–1771, which aroused widespread interest in his claim of the existence of an unknown continent. Meanwhile, James Cook had been appointed in his place to lead an expedition to the South Pacific which in 1770 discovered the east coast of Australia.

In 1772 Dalrymple published his first set of charts, four of which were of the seas around Sulu. In 1779, he headed the hydrographic office of the East India Company, and that of the Admiralty in 1795. He remained Hydrographer of the Royal Navy until his death in 1808.

In 1782 he was elected a foreign member of the Royal Swedish Academy of Sciences.

In 1820, he was honoured when a Scottish surgeon and botanist William Roxburgh, first published the genus name Dalrympelea to a group of flowering shrubs from Tropical Asia, in Pl. Coromandel Vol.3 on page 76 in 1820.

Notes

Sources 
 
Australian Dictionary of Biography. Vol.1 :1788-1850. 1966 Melbourne University Press.
Dalrymple, Alexander (ca. 1790). Practical Navigation. Printer's proof. National Library of Scotland, shelfmark Nha.M90 (3)
Friendly, Alfred. Beaufort of the Admiralty. New York. Random House, 1977
Huler, Scott (2004). Defining the Wind: The Beaufort Scale, and How a 19th-Century Admiral Turned Science into Poetry. Crown. 
Howard T. Fry, Alexander Dalrymple (1737-1808) and the Expansion of British Trade, London, Cass for the Royal Commonwealth Society, 1970.

External links 

 Portrait of Alexander Dalrymple, National Museum of Scotland
 Historical Collection of the Several Voyages and Discoveries in the South Pacific Ocean (1770–1771). (Canadiana and Internet Archive make available digitised scans taken from microfiche which were in turn filmed from volumes held at Thomas Fisher Rare Book Library, in the University of Toronto Library. Other libraries also hold physical copies of the original books.)  IA Open Library, WorldCat 5258438
 Volume I, Being chiefly a literal translation from the Spanish writers: Canadiana, Internet Archive. 
 Volume II, Containing the Dutch voyages. Canadiana, Internet Archive.

1737 births
1808 deaths
Fellows of the Royal Society
Hydrographers of the Royal Navy
Members of the Royal Swedish Academy of Sciences
Scottish geographers
Scottish hydrographers
Younger sons of baronets
British invasion of Manila